Sarıxanlı (also, Sarxanlı and Sarykhanly) is a village and the most populous municipality, except the capital Imishli, in the Imishli Rayon of Azerbaijan.  It has a population of 6,251.  The municipality consists of the villages of Sarıxanlı and Vətəgə.

References 

Populated places in Imishli District